The Tanaka Giichi Cabinet is the 26th Cabinet of Japan led by Tanaka Giichi from April 20, 1927 to July 2, 1929.

Cabinet

References 

Cabinet of Japan
1927 establishments in Japan
Cabinets established in 1927
Cabinets disestablished in 1929